Dugald Christie may refer to:

 Dugald Christie (missionary) (1855–1936), British missionary to China
 Dugald Christie (lawyer) (1941–2006), Canadian lawyer and political activist